CKEN-FM is a Canadian radio station, broadcasting from Kentville, Nova Scotia at 97.7 FM. The station currently plays a country format and is branded on-air as AVR (which is short for Annapolis Valley Radio). The station has been on the air since 1947.

The station originally broadcast at 1490 AM, then moved to 1350 in 1953, then back to 1490 in 1979. In July 2002, the station received CRTC approval to move to 94.9 FM, but instead moved to 97.7 FM in 2003. CKWM-FM moved to 94.9 and became Magic 94.9. Both stations are owned by the Maritime Broadcasting System.

Rebroadcasters

On November 15, 2011, MBS received CRTC approval to operate CKDY as a separate, locally originated station, with CKDY-1-FM continuing to repeat CKDY.

CKEN-FM's programming previously simulcasted on CFAB AM in Windsor; that station broke off from the AVR network in 2008, to broadcast as an independently operated station.

On February 26, 2020, the station's copper wiring and computer system was stolen by an unknown person. This has resulted in the AM signal being off-air, leaving listeners to rely on the FM signal in Weymouth. On February 28, 2020, an arrest was made involving a 40-year old unnamed woman, who has subsequently been facing charges in connection with theft and vandalization. She is due in the Digby provincial court in April.

In March 2020, the CRTC approved Maritime Broadcasting System's application to temporarily operate CKDY on FM at 99.7 MHz until the AM signal at 1420 kHz returns to the air. There's a potential that CKDY may remain on 99.7 FM if the radio station decides to permanently shutdown the AM signal.

On September 30, 2020, Maritime Broadcasting System Limited submitted an application 
for a broadcasting licence to operate an english-language commercial FM radio station in Digby, NS to replace its AM radio station CKDY Digby. The new station would operate at 99.7 MHz (channel 259B1) with an average effective radiated power (ERP) of 2.39 kW (directional antenna with a maximum ERP of 6.53 KW with an effective height of antenna above average terrain of 165.7 metres).

On May 3, 2021, the CRTC approved Maritime Broadcasting System's application to move CKDY to 99.7 MHz.

References

External links
 AVR Network
 
 CKDY history - Canadian Communications Foundation
CKAD history -  Canadian Communications Foundation

 

Ken
Ken
Ken
Radio stations established in 1947
1947 establishments in Nova Scotia